Tsogo may be:

The Tsogo people of Gabon (Mitsogo)
The Tsogo language (Getsogo)